Rear-Admiral Michael Anthony William Bath (born 1966) is a retired senior Royal Navy officer who served as Naval Secretary.

Education
He was educated at King Edward VI Five Ways School, the University of Leicester (BSc, 1987) and King's College London (MA Defence Studies).

Naval career
Bath became Assistant Chief of Staff at Permanent Joint Headquarters in October 2009, head of strategy and programmes for the new employment model in April 2012 and Director of Naval Personnel Strategy and Assistant Chief of Staff (People Capability) in January 2015. He went on to be Naval Secretary, Assistant Chief of the Naval Staff (Personnel) and Flag Officer, Reserves in June 2018. Bath retired from the Royal Navy and is now Executive Director of People and Organisational Development at Marie Curie UK. Bath retired from the Royal Navy on 1 May 2020.

References

1966 births
Living people
People educated at King Edward VI Five Ways
Alumni of the University of Leicester
Alumni of King's College London
Royal Navy rear admirals